Molotov Solution is the first studio album by deathcore band Molotov Solution. It is the last release to feature vocalist Kyle Davis.

Track listing

Band members
Kyle Davis - lead vocals
Robbie Pina - lead guitar, rhythm guitar
Kevin Oakley - bass guitar
Matt Manchuso - drums

References 

2008 debut albums
Molotov Solution albums